The Cleurie or rupt de Cleurie is a river in Lorraine in France, which flows in the Vosges department. It is a right tributary of the Moselotte, and thus a sub-tributary of the Rhine, via the Moselotte and the Moselle.

Geography 
The Cleurie rises in the massif des Vosges, within the commune of Gérardmer from the confluence of two streams, the Corsaire and the Noir Rupt. It receives Liézey stream on its right, flows through Le Tholy, follows La Forge, Le Syndicat and Cleurie, then flows into the right bank of the Moselotte at Saint-Amé.

Its name is found in the denomination of the Communauté de communes de la Vallée de la Cleurie.

Hydrology 
The flow rate of the Cleurie river has been measured at Cleurie over 38 years from 1967 to 2007.

The Cleurie river exhibits moderate seasonal variation in flow rate. These monthly averages, however, hide more pronounced short-term variations, especially since the flow rate varies from year to year.

Floods can be very significant for a small river endowed with a minimal basin. The maximum instantaneous flow rates over a 2-year and 5-year period (MIFR2 and MIFR5) measure  respectively. The MIFR10 measures , the MIFR20 measures  and the MIFR50 measures . These numbers correspond to about a third of the flooding flow rates of the Moselotte.

Comparing these values with the scale of the MIFR's listed above suggests that the floods of January 1995 were almost of the order of IMFR50 and quite exceptional, and that a flood of that size should occur on average once every 40 years.

All in all, the Cleurie is a very significant river. The specific flow rate is very high at 35.2 litres per second per square kilometre of basin.

See also
 List of rivers of France

References

External links 
  
 

Rivers of Vosges (department)
Rivers of Grand Est
Rivers of France